WRLO-FM (105.3 FM) is a radio station in Antigo, Wisconsin, United States, that serves the Wausau - Rhinelander, Wisconsin area. The station is owned by NRG Media through licensee NRG License Sub, LLC and features programming from Fox News Radio and Westwood One. It broadcasts a classic rock format.

The Bob and Tom Show |Cara Middays| Duff Damos-Afternoons | Nights with Alice Cooper-----
Weekend Features | Dee Snider's House Of Hair | Live in Concert | Joe Kelly's Sunrise Sunday

History
The station's original call letters were WATK-FM. In the late 1970s, the current call letters were adopted, initially broadcasting an easy listening format. The station broadcast on 104.9 until the spring of 1980.

References

External links

RLO-FM
Classic rock radio stations in the United States
NRG Media radio stations